The vinaceous dove (Streptopelia vinacea) is a bird species in the pigeon family Columbidae that widely resident across the Sahel and Sudan (region).

Taxonomy
The vinaceous dove was formally described in 1789 by the German naturalist Johann Friedrich Gmelin in his revised and expanded edition of Carl Linnaeus's Systema Naturae. He placed it with all the other doves and pigeons in the genus Columba and coined the binomial name Columba vinacea. Gmelin based his description on the earlier publications by the French ornithologists Mathurin Jacques Brisson and Georges-Louis Leclerc, Comte de Buffon. The vinaceous dove is now placed with 14 other species in the genus Streptopelia that was introduced in 1855 by the French ornithologist Charles Lucien Bonaparte. The genus name is from the Ancient Greek στρεπτός (streptós) – literal meaning "twisted" but, by extension, "wearing a torc" (i.e., twisted metal collar) – and πέλεια (péleia) meaning "wild dove". The specific vinacea is from Latin vinaceus meaning "of wine" or "vinaceous". The species is monotypic: no subspecies are recognised.

Description
The vinaceous dove is a small, stocky pigeon, typically 25 cm in length. Its back, wings and tail are pale brown. When flying, it shows a blackish underwing. The head and the underparts are pale pinkish-grey, and there is a black hind neck patch edged with white. The legs are red, and there is white in the tail. Sexes are similar, but juveniles are duller than adults. The call is a fast coo-cu-cu-coo.

Distribution and habitat
This species is abundant in scrub and savannah. It builds a stick nest in a tree, often an acacia, and lays two white eggs. Its flight is quick, with the regular beats and an occasional sharp flick of the wings which are characteristic of pigeons in general.

Vinaceous doves eat grass seeds, grains and other vegetation. They are quite terrestrial, and usually forage on the ground.

Unlike several other species in this genus, they are very gregarious and often feed in large group frequently with other doves.

References 

 Birds of The Gambia by Barlow, Wacher and Disley, 

vinaceous dove
Birds of the Sahel
Birds of Sub-Saharan Africa
vinaceous dove
vinaceous dove